The Big Ears Festival is an annual music festival in Knoxville, Tennessee, created and produced by AC Entertainment.

History
The festival was founded in 2009 by Ashley Capps, founder of AC Entertainment. The festival was originally organized by Ashley Capps in partnership with Jason Boardman of Knoxville's Pilot Light and Chris Molinski of the Knoxville Museum of Art.

The 2009 edition, which took place February 6–8, featured Antony And The Johnsons, Burning Star Core, Nicolas Collins, David Daniell, Dan Deacon, Fence Kitchen, Fennesz, Fennesz/linkous/minor, Michael Gira, Philip Glass, Larkin Grimm, Neil Hamburger, Jon Hassell, Matmos, The Necks, Negativland, Pauline Oliveros, Wendy Sutter, Shaking Ray Levis, and Ned Rothenberg.

In 2010, famed composer Terry Riley was named as the first "Artist in Residence" of the Big Ears Festival.  The festival celebrated his 75th birthday year with three days of concerts by Terry Riley and a host of collaborators. In addition to Riley as "Artist in Residence", musician Bryce Dessner of the band The National was a guest curator of the festival.

The 2010 edition, which took place March 26–28, featured Abe Vigoda, Ahleuchatistas, Sam Amidon, Andrew W.K., Argentinum Astrum, Bang On A Can All-Stars, William Basinski, Adrian Belew, Iva Bittova, The Books, Buke & Gass, Calder Quartet, Clogs, Damaged Patients, Bryce Dessner, Destroyed By Magnets, Dirty Projectors, Doveman, The 802 Tour, Eric-jon, The Ex, Forest Magic, Ben Frost, Gang Gang Dance, Jens Hannemann, Tim Hecker, Shelley Hirsch, Javelin, jj, Konk Pack, Lesser Gonzalez Alvarez, Liturgy, Andy Moor, Nico Muhly, My Brightest Diamond, The National, New Brutalism, Joanna Newsom, Nosaj Thing, Gyan Riley, Terry Riley, DJ/rupture, Shaking Ray Levis, Shortwave Society, Tracy Silverman, Nadia Sirota, Ches Smith, Sufjan Stevens, St. Vincent, Vampire Weekend, Videohippos, Villages, Warband, and The xx.

In addition to the musical performances in 2010, Jessica Dessner, sister of Bryce Dessner, organized the first Big Ears film festival at the Knoxville Museum of Art which featured an exhibition of The BQE by Sufjan Stevens.

Big Ears 2011, originally planned for the first half of the year, was eventually postponed due to scheduling conflicts, and then quietly canceled altogether.

In the summer of 2013, AC Entertainment began to tease a revival of the event on its official Facebook page, pledging news "in the coming weeks". 
Big Ears' return was announced on October 23, 2013 and took place March 28–30, 2014. Curated by Steve Reich, it featured Television, John Cale, Julia Holter, Low, and Radiohead's Jonny Greenwood among others.

The 2015 edition featured Kronos Quartet, Laurie Anderson, Swans, Ben Frost, William Tyler, Max Richter, Silver Apples, Steve Gunn, Grouper, Nels Cline, Zs, Omar Souleyman, among others.

The 2016 edition featured Kamasi Washington, Angel Olsen, Andrew Bird, Laurie Anderson with Philip Glass, Marc Ribot, Faust, Yo La Tengo, Lambchop, Sunn O))) and many others.

All festivals since 2020 went on hiatus to help contain the spread of the virus during the COVID-19 pandemic.

Reviews
Ben Ratliff, writing for The New York Times in 2009: "You could say that Big Ears was for people who like hearing nuanced music in excellent theaters, in a city with no hassle: a place where you can walk down the main drag on Saturday night and see 10 feet of empty space between you and the next pair of feet. You could also say that Big Ears was for people with long attention spans, good concentration and an appetite for letting repetitive non-dance music wash over them. And at least in its first edition — Mr. Capps intends to repeat Big Ears in Knoxville, and also export the idea to other cities — Big Ears was for concertgoers who appreciate not hearing a lot of introductions and context and sponsor announcements before the music even starts. In other words, at times it was heaven."

In 2010 the festival was praised by Rolling Stone as "arguably the classiest, most diverse festival in the country."

After an extremely successful return of the festival in 2014, Christopher Weingarten of Rolling Stone wrote that "Big Ears 2014 is the most ambitious avant-garde festival to emerge in America in more than a decade."

Notes

 Eclecticism is music to Big Ears, Los Angeles Times, 2010
 Report: Big Ears Festival Pitchfork, 2010
 9 Best Moments of the Big Ears Festival Spin, 2010
 CoS at Big Ears Festival 2010, Consequence of Sound, 2010
  Report: Big Ears Festival Pitchfork, 2009

External links
 Official Big Ears Festival Website

Culture of Knoxville, Tennessee
Music festivals in Tennessee
Tourist attractions in Knoxville, Tennessee
2009 establishments in Tennessee